In the run-up to the 1999 Scottish Parliament election, various organisations conducted opinion polls to gauge voting intentions. Results of such polls are displayed in this list. Most of the pollsters listed were members of the British Polling Council (BPC) and abided by its disclosure rules.

Constituency vote

Regional vote

References

Scotland 1999
Opinion polling for Scottish Parliament elections
Opinion polling for United Kingdom votes in the 1990s